Natalie Lorraine Sawyer (born 23 October 1979) is an English television and podcast presenter and Talksport radio presenter.

Sawyer parted company with Sky Sports News in March 2018, after eighteen years of service having initially joined the production team. From the 2018 FIFA World Cup onwards Sawyer began presenting The Game for The Times.

Personal life

She was married to former Sky Sports News colleague Sam Matterface and they have a son named Sawyer, born on 28 October 2010. Sawyer and Matterface divorced in 2014.

Sawyer is a fan of Brentford. In 2012 the club featured her in an advertising campaign that saw her image used on a bus in an effort to promote their ticket prices.  She was born to an English father and a Bulgarian mother.
She has been dating footballer Jonathan Douglas since 2015.

References

External links
Natalie Sawyer at TV Newsroom

1979 births
Living people
English people of Bulgarian descent
People from Ealing
Sky Sports presenters and reporters
Alumni of Leeds Trinity University